Philip Martyn Serrell (born 27 March 1954) is an English auctioneer, antiques expert and television presenter who appears as regular presenter on BBC TV antiques programmes such as Bargain Hunt and Flog It!. He began his career as a livestock trade auctioneer, but he became a chartered surveyor in 1988 to analyse antiques. Serrell has also participated in musical charity events, performing as a singer with The Celebs.

Early life
Serrell was born in Kidderminster, Worcestershire and  attended the Royal Grammar School in Worcester, where he was a schoolmate of the Pakistani cricket captain Imran Khan. Serrell played both cricket and rugby for the school, prior to his attendance at, and graduation from, Loughborough College of Physical Education as a physical education teacher.

Career
Dissatisfied as a teacher, Serrell changed careers to become an auctioneer, working in the local livestock trade until qualifying as a chartered surveyor in 1988, specialising in fine art and antiques.

Serrell owns an auctioneers and valuers firm with offices in Worcester and a salesroom in Great Malvern, established in 1995. He is a regular expert on the BBC series Bargain Hunt and Flog It! and has also made a couple of appearances on ITV's Dickinson's Real Deal. He has also featured on other BBC series Antiques Road Trip and Put Your Money Where Your Mouth Is (where he is light-heartedly billed as Phil "The Fox" Serrell).

He has regularly appeared on BBC Local Radio, and has also written a biweekly column for the Worcester News.

Personal life
Married, he lives in Worcester with his wife. Serrell is an avid collector, living in a "house full of tat". He is a fan of Aston Martin cars and is a supporter of  Worcester Warriors rugby club.

Music career
In 2017, Serrell embarked on a music career with fellow BBC Antique Experts Charles Hanson, Charlie Ross and James Braxton by recording a Rock version of the classic "Sleigh Ride" in aid of BBC Children In Need. It was produced by father and son team Grahame and Jack Corbyn and released digitally on independent record label Saga Entertainment. The single peaked at number 1 on the Amazon Rock Charts.

In 2018, Serrell once again took to the microphone with Charlie Ross, James Braxton and 24 celebrities, to perform a new Christmas song called "Rock With Rudolph". The song was written and produced by Grahame and Jack Corbyn and released digitally on 30 November 2018 through independent record label Saga Entertainment, in aid of Great Ormond Street Hospital. Released under the artist name The Celebs. The music video debuted exclusively with The Sun on 29 November 2018 and had its first TV showing on Good Morning Britain on 30 November 2018. The song peaked at number two on the iTunes pop chart.

In 2020 amid the COVID-19 crisis Philip Serrell reunited with his fellow BBC antique experts James Braxton, Charlie Ross (antiques expert) and a supergroup of celebrities known as The Celebs which included Frank Bruno and X Factor winner Sam Bailey to raise money for both Alzheimer's Society and Action for Children. They recorded a new rendition of Merry Christmas Everyone by Shakin' Stevens and it was released digitally on 11 December 2020, on independent record label Saga Entertainment. The music video debuted on Good Morning Britain the day before release. The song peaked at number two on the iTunes pop chart.

Published works
An Auctioneer's Lot
Sold to the Man with the Tin Leg

References

External links 

BBC Bio
Interview at BBC website

1954 births
Living people
Antiques experts
English television presenters
English radio personalities
English writers
Mass media people from Worcester, England
People educated at the Royal Grammar School Worcester
Alumni of Loughborough University
English auctioneers
Business people from Worcester, England